Nottingham Central Library is the main public lending library in Nottingham, England.

History

The first Nottingham Public Lending Library opened on 13 April 1868. It was opened by Mayor John Barber. It contained almost 10,000 books, 400 members signed up on the first day and 70,512 books were issued in the first year.

It started life on Thurland Street in premises formerly used by Artizans’ Library. The Artizans’ library had been founded in 1824. The building on Thurland Street later became the Nottingham Corn Exchange.

The Thurland Street premises eventually proved to be inadequate and a new building was erected on Sherwood Street in 1879 adjoining University College. In 1932 this was extended when a new reading hall was added, and a gymnasium was provided for staff (a feature unique in libraries in the country). The architect for the extension and improvements was Thomas Wallis Gordon.

In 1964, there was some controversy when the Chief Librarian, F.C. Tighe, withdrew Enid Blyton’s “The Adventures of Noddy’’ and nearly all her other works because he felt they did not use a sufficiently wide vocabulary.

In 1977 the library moved again to a property on Angel Row. This building had originally been built between 1898 and 1899 by the architect Harry Gill as a shop and warehouse for Henry Barker. It was converted by Michael Tempest and Colin McIntosh of the Nottinghamshire County Architect's Department for use as a library.

Modern times  

By the late 2010s the facility was again found inadequate and Nottingham City Council planned a £10m relocation as part of the redevelopment of the Broadmarsh Shopping Centre when creating a new southside gateway to the city, close to the rail station. Closure of the Angel Row site on 20 March 2020 was part of the COVID-19 lockdown precautions, followed by intended sale of the building for redevelopment. The main content of books and records was placed into storage until the new location in a complex adjacent to the new Broadmarsh bus station could be finished and fitted out. As of late 2022, no firm date had been given.

Nottingham City Chief Librarians
John Potter Briscoe 1868 - 1916
Walter Alwyn Briscoe 1916 - 1934
Duncan Gray 1934 - 1953
Francis Charles Tighe 1953 - 1964

References

Libraries in Nottinghamshire
1868 establishments in England
Buildings and structures in Nottingham